Aleksander Klima (born 13 August 1945) is a Polish former biathlete. He competed in the 20 km individual event at the 1972 Winter Olympics.

References

External links
 

1945 births
Living people
Polish male biathletes
Olympic biathletes of Poland
Biathletes at the 1972 Winter Olympics
People from Oschatz